Events in the year 1161 in Japan.

Incumbents
Monarch: Go-Shirakawa

Births
September 20 - Emperor Takakura (d. 1181)

References

 
 
Japan
Years of the 12th century in Japan